Julio César González Ibarra (July 30, 1976 – March 10, 2012) was a Mexican professional boxer who competed from 1997 to 2011, and held the WBO and lineal light heavyweight titles from 2003 to 2004.

Amateur career
Gonzalez was a member of the 1996 Mexican Olympic team, boxing as a light heavyweight. He was eliminated in the 1st round by eventual gold medalist Vasili Jirov of Kazakhstan.

Professional career
He entered the professional boxing ranks in 1997 after a moderately successful amateur career and gradually worked his way through the ranks of the light heavyweight journeymen. He had won his first 21 fights by the time he got his first chance at a boxing title, the regional WBC Fecarbox belt, on May 5, 2000. He defeated unbeaten fellow Mexican Jesus Ruiz on a ninth round technical knockout in Commerce, California.

Gonzalez followed that victory up with five more wins, including a 12-round unanimous decision over Julian Letterlough on February 2, 2001, that won him the regional NABO light heavyweight title - and propelled him into the No. 1 contender's position in several sanctioning bodies' ratings.

As the top contender, he earned a fight with WBC, WBA (Super), & IBF champion Roy Jones Jr. in July 2001, in Los Angeles. Gonzalez went the distance with Jones, but lost a unanimous decision for his first career setback.

He took seven months off after the loss to Jones before resuming his career and running off seven straight wins without a loss. Most notable in his comeback streak was a 10-round majority decision over former world champion Glen Johnson on January 24, 2003.

WBO and lineal light heavyweight champion
Gonzalez earned his second shot at a world title on October 18, 2003, when he flew to Hamburg, Germany for a showdown with undefeated Dariusz Michalczewski for the Lineal & WBO light heavyweight championship. Going into the fight, Michalczewski was positioned to tie Rocky Marciano's all-time record of 49 wins and no losses. He also was looking to extend his own world record of 23 straight successful defenses of the light heavyweight title.

In the fight, Gonzalez seemed to take control of the action in the middle rounds, and fought back strongly when Michalczewski, a knockout artist, got him in trouble a few times. When the fight was over, Gonzalez got the verdict on a 12-round split decision; the judge from Germany was the lone dissenter.

Gonzalez lost his title to Zsolt Erdei on January 17, 2004, by unanimous decision.

He challenged Clinton Woods for the IBF light heavyweight title on September 9, 2005, losing by unanimous decision. He met Woods again in a title fight rematch on September 29, 2007. Woods again won the fight by unanimous decision.

In 2008 he was stopped by undefeated prospect Tavoris Cloud.

Death 
On March 10, 2012, Gonzalez was killed on impact in a motorcycle accident when he was hit by a drunk driver in B.C. Sur, Mexico.  The Julio Gonzalez Memorial Foundation was started in his memory.

Professional boxing record

See also
List of light heavyweight boxing champions
List of WBO world champions
List of Mexican boxing world champions

References

External links

1976 births
2012 deaths
Boxers from Baja California Sur
World Boxing Organization champions
Road incident deaths in Mexico
Motorcycle road incident deaths
Olympic boxers of Mexico
Boxers at the 1996 Summer Olympics
Mexican male boxers
Cruiserweight boxers
World light-heavyweight boxing champions
People from Mulegé Municipality